DWRL (1080 AM) Radyo Pilipino is a radio station owned and operated by Radyo Pilipino Media Group through its licensee Radio Audience Developers Integrated Organization (RADIO), Inc. The station's studio is located at Purok 5, Brgy. Rawis, Legazpi, Albay.

History
DWRL was inaugurated on June 12, 1983, the studios located at the PNR Legazpi Terminal. In November 2006, its transmitter was destroyed by Typhoon Reming. In January 2007, DWRL moved to its current home in Brgy. Rawis. On May 7, 2007, it went on air once again. In November 2015, it launched its FM repeater via 88.3 FM. In 2019, when 88.3 was launched as One FM, the latter retained its 6am to 10am simulcast. By 2020, all of RadioCorp's stations carry the Radyo Pilipino branding.

References

Radio stations in Legazpi, Albay
News and talk radio stations in the Philippines
Radio stations established in 1980